The Bishan–Toa Payoh Group Representation Constituency (GRC) is a four-member Group Representation Constituency located in the central region of Singapore. The GRC consists the entire areas of Bishan, Singapore (excluding Bishan North), the majority of Toa Payoh, parts of Thomson, Singapore. There are four divisions of the GRC: Bishan East, Toa Payoh West, Toa Payoh East and Toa Payoh Central. The current Member of Parliament (MP) are Ng Eng Hen, Saktiandi Supaat, Chong Kee Hiong and Chee Hong Tat from the People's Action Party (PAP).

Members of Parliament

Electoral results

Elections in 1990s

Elections in 2000s

Elections in 2010s

Elections in 2020s

References
2020 General Election's result
2015 General Election's result
2011 General Election's result
2006 General Election's result
2001 General Election's result
1997 General Election's result
1991 General Election's result
1988 General Election's result

Singaporean electoral divisions
Bishan, Singapore
Toa Payoh